Alok Bhargava (born 13 July 1954) is an Indian econometrician. He studied mathematics at Delhi University and economics and econometrics at the London School of Economics. He is currently a full professor at the University of Maryland School of Public Policy.

Education 
In 1974 he received his B.A with honors in Mathematics at Delhi University. In 1977 he got his B.Sc in Economics at London School of Economics.
In 1978 he received his M.Sc in Economometrics at London School of Economics.
Bhargava received his Ph.D. in econometrics from the London School of Economics under the supervision of John Denis Sargan in 1982. His thesis (The Theory of the Durbin–Watson Statistic with special reference to the Specification of Models in Levels as against in Differences) led to many tests for unit roots that were used in co-integration analyses. Bhargava was also one of the pioneers in econometric methods for longitudinal ("panel") data.

Career
From 1983 till 1989 he served as an Assistant Professor of Economics at University of Pennsylvania. From 1989 till 1993 he was an Associate Professor of Economics at University of Houston and was a full professor from 1994 to around 2012. During the autumn of 1995 he was invited to teach at Harvard University as a Visiting Professor. 
In 1999 he was a Senior Global Health Leadership Fellow at World Health Organization. In 2005 he served as a Visiting Professor at University of Paris.

Since 1991, Bhargava has been publishing on important aspects of nutrition, food policy, population health, child development, demography, epidemiology, AIDS, and finance in developing and developed countries. His academic publications demonstrate the usefulness of rigorous econometric and statistical methods in addressing issues of under-nutrition and poor child health in developing countries, as well as obesity in developed countries.

Bhargava was an editor of the Journal of Econometrics (1997 and 2014) and is an associate editor of the multi-disciplinary journal Economics and Human Biology. He has held teaching positions at the University of Pennsylvania, Harvard University and University of Houston, and has published over 70 articles in academic journals.

Books and reviews 
A collection of his works has been reprinted in a separate volume in 2006 entitled "Econometrics, statistics and computational approaches in food and health sciences". A monograph entitled "Food, economics, and health" was published in 2008 [4] and was reviewed in the Journal of the American Medical Association with the commendation that "Alok Bhargava is a pioneer in efforts to break down the existing firewalls between the biomedical and social sciences and between the health profession and the food systems (https://jamanetwork.com/journals/jama/article-abstract/186008).

Selected publications

References 

Econometricians
Living people
Indian emigrants to the United States
Alumni of the London School of Economics
Harvard University faculty
University of Pennsylvania faculty
University of Houston faculty
People from Rajasthan
Delhi University alumni
1954 births
University of Maryland, College Park faculty
American people of Indian descent